Devil's Bowling Green Battery was an artillery battery in the British Overseas Territory of Gibraltar. In 1859 the battery had two guns that looked over Little Bay. This battery was on the shoreline but it was overlooked by the Buena Vista Battery and the seven guns of the Europa Pass Battery

References

Batteries in Gibraltar